Justine Henin defeated Svetlana Kuznetsova in the final, 6–1, 6–3 to win the women's singles tennis title at the 2007 US Open. She did not lose a set during the tournament. It was her last major title and final US Open appearance.

Maria Sharapova was the defending champion, but was defeated by Agnieszka Radwańska in the third round.

This was the final major singles appearance of former world No. 1 and five-time major singles champion Martina Hingis, who retired in November 2007 (she would later return to the sport in doubles and mixed doubles starting in 2013). She was beaten in the third round by Victoria Azarenka. It was also the first US Open main draw appearance for future world No. 1 and Australian Open champion Caroline Wozniacki, who lost in the second round to Alizé Cornet.

Seeds

  Justine Henin (champion)
  Maria Sharapova (third round)
  Jelena Janković (quarterfinals)
  Svetlana Kuznetsova (final)
  Ana Ivanovic (fourth round)
  Anna Chakvetadze (semifinals)
  Nadia Petrova (third round)
  Serena Williams (quarterfinals)
  Daniela Hantuchová (first round)
  Marion Bartoli (fourth round)
  Patty Schnyder (third round)
  Venus Williams (semifinals)
  Nicole Vaidišová (third round)
  Elena Dementieva (third round)
  Dinara Safina (fourth round)
  Martina Hingis (third round)
  Tatiana Golovin (first round)
  Shahar Pe'er (quarterfinals)
  Sybille Bammer (fourth round)
  Lucie Šafářová (third round)
  Alona Bondarenko (third round)
  Katarina Srebotnik (second round)
  Tathiana Garbin (first round)
  Francesca Schiavone (second round)
  Mara Santangelo (first round)
  Sania Mirza (third round)
  Vera Zvonareva (third round)
  Ai Sugiyama (second round)
  Samantha Stosur (first round)
  Agnieszka Radwańska (fourth round)
  Anabel Medina Garrigues (third round)
  Michaëlla Krajicek (second round)

Qualifying

Draw

Finals

Top half

Section 1

Section 2

Section 3

Section 4

Bottom half

Section 5

Section 6

Section 7

Section 8

Championship match statistics

External links
 Draws
2007 US Open – Women's draws and results at the International Tennis Federation

Women's Singles
US Open (tennis) by year – Women's singles
2007 in women's tennis
2007 in American women's sports